The 2011 Torneo Apertura or LXXXVIII Campeonato Nacional de Fútbol Profesional de la Primera División de Chile was the 88th season of Chilean Primera División.

The season started on Friday 28 January with Católica's 2–0 inaugural match win over Deportes Iquique, and concluded on Sunday 12 June in the tournament final won by Universidad de Chile over the same Universidad Católica which didn't repeat its title from previous season.

Teams
A total of 18 teams contested the league, including 16 sides from 2010 season, and two promoted from the Primera B that replaced to the relegated Everton (17th) and San Luis de Quillota (18th) after finishing in the aggregate's table bottom.

Deportes Iquique reached the promotion to Primera División after winning the 2010 Primera B de Chile, so that The Dragons recovered their category lost in 2009, closing a brief absence of one season. However, with Iquique's 2010 Copa Chile Bicentenario title they were automatically qualified to the 2011 Copa Sudamericana second stage. The second promoted team was Unión La Calera as Primera B runner-up, so they returned to the top division after a 25-years absence.

Stadia and locations

Managerial changes

Regular season

Standings

Results

Playoffs

Bracket

Results

Quarterfinals

Semifinals

Finals

Pre-Copa Sudamericana playoff
Universidad de Chile (regular season second-placed team) played a two-legged tie against Deportes Concepción (2010 Copa Chile Bicentenario runner-up) for the  2011 Copa Sudamericana preliminary stages qualification as Chile 3 berth.

Top goalscorers

References

External links
ANFP 
2011 Torneo Apertura at Soccerway
Season regulations 

Primera División de Chile seasons
Chile
Prim